This is the complete discography of musician Neal Morse.

Studio albums

With Spock's Beard

 The Light (1995)
 Beware of Darkness (1996)
 The Kindness of Strangers (1998)
 Day for Night (1999)
 V (2000)
 Snow (2002)

Singer-songwriter albums
 Neal Morse (1999)
 It's Not Too Late (2002)
 Songs from the Highway (2007)
 Songs from November (2014)
 Life & Times (2018)

Prog albums
 Testimony (2003)
 One (2004)
 ? (2005)
 Sola Scriptura (2007)
 Lifeline (2008)
 Testimony 2 (2011)
 Momentum (2012)
 Jesus Christ the Exorcist (2019)
 Sola Gratia (2020)

Worship albums
 Lead Me Lord (Worship Sessions Volume 1) (2005)
 God Won't Give Up (2005)
 Send the Fire (Worship Sessions Volume 2) (2006)
 Secret Place (Worship Sessions Volume 3) (2008)
 The River (Worship Sessions Volume 4) (2009)
 Mighty to Save (Worship Sessions Volume 5) (2010)
 Get in the Boat (2013)
 To God Be the Glory (2016)
 Last Minute Christmas Album (2020)

With Transatlantic

SMPT:e (2000)
Bridge Across Forever (2001)
The Whirlwind (2009)
Kaleidoscope (2014)
The Absolute Universe (2021)

With Flying Colors

Flying Colors (2012)
Second Nature (2014)
Third Degree (2019)

With The Neal Morse Band
 The Grand Experiment (2015)
 The Similitude of a Dream (2016)
 The Great Adventure (2019)
 Innocence & Danger (2021)

With Morse, Portnoy & George
 Cover to Cover (2006)
 Cover 2 Cover (2012)
 Cov3r to Cov3r (2020)

With D'Virgilio, Morse & Jennings 
 Troika (2022)

Live albums
 ? Live (2007)
 So Many Roads: Live in Europe (2009)
 Testimony 2: Live in Los Angeles (2011)
 Live Momentum (2013)
 Morsefest 2014: Testimony and One LIVE (2015)
 Morsefest 2015: ? and Sola Scriptura LIVE (2017)
 Live at the Downey Theater 2008 (2019)
 Winter Worship Tour 2012 (2019)
 Cal Prog 2004 (2019)
 Testimony Live 2003 (2019)
 3 Rivers Prog Festival 2008 (2019)
 Jesus Christ: The Exorcist - Live at Morsefest 2018 (2020)
 Life & Times in Milan - June 8th, 2016 (2021)

With The Neal Morse Band
 Alive Again (2016)
 The Similitude of a Dream: Live in Tilburg 2017 (2018)
 Morsefest 2017: Testimony of a Dream (2018)
 The Great AdvenTour: Live in Brno 2019 (2020)
 Morsefest 2019 (2021)
 Morsefest 2021 (2022)
 Morsefest 2020 (2023)

With Spock's Beard
 Official Live Bootleg/The Beard is Out There (1996)
 Live at the Whisky and NEARfest (1999)
 Nick 'n Neal live in Europe – Two Separate Gorillas (2000)
 Don't Try This at Home (2000)
 Don't Try This @ Home Either (2000)
 There & Here (2001)
 Europe '98 (2010)
 Snow Live (2017)
 Offenbach 1-Nov-98 (2019)
 Live at the Astoria - Jun 16, 2001 (2021)

With Transatlantic
 Live in America (2001)
 Live in Europe (2003)
 Whirld Tour 2010: Live in London (2010)
 More Never is Enough: Live @ Manchester & Tilburg 2010 (2011)
 KaLIVEoscope (2014)
 The Final Flight: Live At L'Olympia (2023)

With Yellow Matter Custard

One Night in New York City (2003)
One More Night in New York City (2011)

With Flying Colors
 Live in Europe (2013)
 Second Flight: Live at the Z7 (2015)
 Third Stage: Live in London (2020)
 Morsefest 2019 (2021)

Compilations and rarities
 Merry Christmas from the Morse Family (2000)
 The Transatlantic Demos (2003)
 Sing It High: A Collection of Singles (2007)
 One Demos (2007)
 Neal's Mystery Box (2019)
 Advent Calendar 2019 (2019)
 Inner Circle Sampler (2020)
 Hope and a Future (2020)
 Testimony Demos (2020)
 Question Mark Demos (2020)
 Sola Scriptura Demos (2020)

With Spock's Beard
 From the Vault (1997)
 The First Twenty Years (2015)
 The Demos 1995-2000 (2020)

With Transatlantic
 SMPT:e - As Mixed By Roine Stolt 1999 (2003)

With The Prog World Orchestra
 A Proggy Christmas (2012)

Video albums
 Testimony Live (2004)
 Sola Scriptura and Beyond (2008)
 Testimony 2: Live in Los Angeles (2011)
 Live Momentum (2013)
 Morsefest 2014 (2015)
 Morsefest 2015 (2017)
 Life and Times Live (2018)
 Voices of the Beard: Storytellers 2 (2019)
 Jesus Christ: The Exorcist - Live at Morsefest 2018 (2020)

With The Neal Morse Band
 Alive Again (2016)
 The Similitude of a Dream: Live in Tilburg 2017 (2018)
 Morsefest 2017: Testimony of a Dream (2018)
 The Great AdvenTour: Live in Brno 2019 (2020)
 Morsefest 2019 (2021)
 Morsefest 2021 (2022)
 Morsefest 2020 (2023)

With Spock's Beard
 The Spock's Beard Home Movie (1998)
 Live at the Whisky (1999)
 Don't Try This at Home: Live in Holland / The Making of V (2002)
 The Making of Snow (2004)
 Snow Live (2017)

With Morse Portnoy George
 Making Cover 2 Cover (2012)

With Transatlantic
 Live in Europe (2003)
 Building the Bridge / Live in America (2006)
 The Official Bootleg DVD (2010)
 Whirld Tour 2010 (2010)
 More Never Is Enough: Live @ Manchester & Tilburg 2010 (2011)
 Kaliveoscope (2014)
 The Final Flight: Live At L'Olympia (2023)

With Flying Colors
 The Making of Flying Colors (2012)
 Live in Europe (2013)
 Second Flight: Live at the Z7 (2015)
 Third Stage: Live in London (2020)
 Morsefest 2019 (2021)

With Yellow Matter Custard
 One Night in New York City (2005)
 One More Night in New York City (2011)

Inner Circle fan club audio releases 

 Neal Morse – Inner Circle CD# 1 (May 2005)
 Neal Morse – Live in Berlin: Part 1 (September 2005)
 Neal Morse – Hitman (November 2005)
 Neal Morse – Whispers in the Wind (January 2006)
 Neal Morse – Neal Morse in the 80's (March 2006)
 Neal Morse – Hodgepodge (July 2006)
 Neal Morse – Let's Polka Plus Merry Christmas (November 2006)
 Neal Morse – With a Little Help From My Friends (January 2007)
 Neal Morse – Homeland (March 2007)
 Neal Morse – ? Live (May 2007)
 Neal Morse – Encores and New Songs (July 2007)
 Neal Morse – Acoustic Sunrise (November 2007)
 Neal Morse – From the Inner Circle (January 2008)
 Neal Morse – Demos and Live Stuff (March 2008)
 Neal Morse – Live Scriptura (July 2008)
 Neal Morse – Starless and Other Stuff (November 2008)
 Neal Morse – Roine's Love Mix (January 2009)
 Neal Morse – Excerpts from Jesus Christ: The Exorcist (March 2009)
 Neal Morse – From the Cutting Room Floor (September 2009)
 Neal Morse – Live at All Saints (January 2010)
 Neal Morse – A Collection of Songs & Demos Recorded in the Fall of 2009 (March 2010)
 Neal Morse – Covers & Others (July 2010)
 Neal Morse – Times & Seasons (November 2010)
 Neal Morse – Testimony 1, Set 1 (March 2011)
 Neal Morse – Live in Whittier, Set 2 & 3 (May 2011)
 Neal Morse – Neal Morse in the 80's and 90's (September 2011)
 Neal Morse – A Proggy Christmas (November 2011)
 Neal Morse – The Whirlwind Demo (January 2012)
 Neal Morse – For Flying Colors (May 2012)
 Flying Colors – Island of the Lost Keyboards: Neal's Mix (November 2012)
 Neal Morse – 5 Loaves and 3 Fishes (March 2013)
 Neal Morse – Momentum L.A. Live (May 2013)
 Neal Morse - Neal Morse in the 90's (September 2013)
 Neal Morse – Christmas 2013 (November 2013)
 Neal Morse – The Early Snow Demos (January 2014)
 Neal Morse – The Momentum Demos (May 2014)
 Neal Morse – The Transatlantic Kaleidoscope Demos, Part 1 (September 2014)
 Neal Morse – The Transatlantic Kaleidoscope Demos, Part 2 (November 2014)
 Neal Morse – More Songs from November (March 2015)
 Neal Morse – Inner Circle Concert: Morsefest 2014 (July 2015)
 Neal Morse – Acoustic Sketches (November 2015)
 The Neal Morse Band – The Grand Experiment Demos (March 2016)
 Neal Morse – Falling for Forever and the Kansas Demos (July 2016)
 Neal Morse – The Blues Sessions (November 2016)
 The Neal Morse Band – The Similitude of a Dream Demos, Part 1 (May 2017)
 Neal Morse – Inner Circle 2015 (July 2017)
 Neal Morse – Testimony Two Demos (September 2017)
 Spock's Beard – Morsefest 2016: Inner Circle Jam (November 2017)
 Neal Morse – Live and Acoustic at Morsefest 2017 (January 2018)
 Neal Morse and Friends – Morsefest 2016 Storytellers, Part 1 (March 2018)
 Neal Morse and Friends – Morsefest 2016 Storytellers, Part 2 (May 2018)
 Neal Morse – Life & Times Tour: Live in NYC and a Few Other Places (July 2018)
 Neal Morse – Jesus Christ the Exorcist (September 2018)
 The Neal Morse Band – The Similitude of a Dream Demos, Part 2 (November 2018)
 The Neal Morse Band – Jan 2018 Sessions: Beginning the Adventure (May 2019)
 Neal Morse and Friends – Voices of the Beard: Storytellers 2 (July 2019)
 Flying Colors – Second Nature Roughs (September 2019)
 Neal Morse – More Songs About Coffee & My Wife (November 2019)
 The Neal Morse Band – Continuing the Adventure (March 2020)
 Neal Morse and Friends – Morsefest 2019 Inner Circle Concert: A Year In Neal's Life (May 2020)
 Covers & Encores (July 2020)
 Transatlantic - Live at Wetlands Preserve - NYC 2000 (November 2020)
 The Neal Morse Band - Some More Adventures (January 2021)
 Neal Morse - The Absolute Universe Demos (May 2021).
 Neal Morse - Solo Gratia: The Demos (November 2021)
 Neal Morse - The Troika Demos (May 2022)
 Morse, Portnoy, Gillette, Hubauer & Friends - Live in Cancun 2022 (July 2022)
 Neal Morse - Keys & Strings: Piano & Guitar Improvisations (November 2022)
 Spock's Beard - In the Year 2000 (January 2023)

Inner Circle fan club video releases
 Neal Morse - Inner Circle DVD#1 (July 2005)
 Neal Morse - The Europe Winter 2006 Church Tour DVD (May 2006)
 Neal Morse - Question Mark & Beyond: Tour of Europe 2006 (September 2006)
 Neal Morse - Live at the Kings Centre, Chessington, London, July 8, 2006 (September 2006)
 Neal Morse - Making of Testimony (September 2007)
 Neal Morse - From the Video Vault (May 2008)
 Neal Morse and Friends - Live @ 3RP (September 2008)
 Neal Morse & Band - Lifeline Tour 2008: Zeche Bochum Germany, Part One (May 2009)
 Neal Morse & Band - Lifeline Tour 2008: Zeche Bochum Germany, Part Two (July 2009)
 Neal Morse & Band - Live at Xnoizz Flevo Festival 2009 (November 2009)
 Neal Morse - Live & Acoustic (May 2010)
 Neal Morse - Live in Seattle with Ajalon (September 2010)
 Spock's Beard - Progfest 97 (January 2011)
 Neal Morse - Testimony 2...For You (July 2011)
 Neal Morse - One Under Construction, Part One (March 2012)
 Neal Morse - One Under Construction, Part Two (July 2012)
 Neal Morse - Live: Iso Soitto (September 2012)
 Neal Morse - Acoustic/Live in Mexico City (January 2013)
 The Flower Kings & Neal Morse Band 2013 - 19 Days In Europe (July 2013)
 Neal Morse - Live in Cuijk (March 2014)
 Neal Morse Band - Live in India (July 2014)
 Neal Morse - The Making of ? (January 2015)
 The Neal Morse Band - Live in Athens (May 2015)
 Neal Morse - The Sola Scriptura Sessions (September 2015)
 The Neal Morse Band - Cruise to the Edge 2015 (January 2016)
 The Neal Morse Band - Scenes From a Prog Cruise (May 2016)
 Neal Morse - A Day in the Life (September 2016)
 Neal Morse - Commentary on a Dream, Part One (January 2017)
 Neal Morse - Commentary on a Dream, Part Two (March 2017)
 Neal Morse - Inner Circle 2015 (July 2017)
 Spock's Beard - Morsefest 2016: Inner Circle Jam (November 2017)
 Neal Morse and Friends - Morsefest 2016 Storytellers, Part 1 (March 2018)
 Neal Morse and Friends - Morsefest 2016 Storytellers, Part 2 (May 2018)
 The Neal Morse Band - Limbourg, Le Kursaai, 30-03-2017 (January 2019)
 The Neal Morse Band - The Great Adventure Commentary (March 2019)
 Spock's Beard - But Wait...There's More! (January 2019)
 Neal Morse and Friends - Morsefest 2019 Inner Circle Concert: A Year In Neal's Life (May 2020)
 Neal Morse - Neal's RV Trip (September 2020)
 Transatlantic - Live at Sweden Rock 2014 (November 2020)
 Transatlantic - The Making of The Breath of Life (March 2021)
 Neal Morse - The Making of Lifeline (July 2021)
 The Neal Morse Band - Morsefest 2020: Cover To Cover Night Commentary (September 2021)
 Spock’s Beard: Live in Bochum 1998 (January 2022)
 The Neal Morse Band: A U.S. Tour of Innocence and Danger (March 2022)
 Neal Morse and Friends - Songs From God's Smuggler: Inner Circle Concert 2022 (September 2022)
 Spock's Beard - In the Year 2020 (January 2023)

Selected guest appearances
 Ayreon - Universal Migrator Part 1: The Dream Sequencer (2000)
 Vocals on "The First Man on Earth"
 Ajalon - On the Threshold of Eternity (2005)
 Co-lead vocals on "On the Threshold of Eternity"
 Roine Stolt - Wallstreet Voodoo (2005)
 Lead & background vocals on "Head Above Water", "Everyone Wants to Rule the World" & "Remember"
 Background vocals on "The Observer" & "It's All About Money"
 Hammond organ solo on "Head Above Water"
 Dream Theater - Systematic Chaos (2007)
 Spoken voice on "Repentance"
 Jordan Rudess - The Road Home (2007)
 Vocals on "Dance on a Volcano"
 Steve Hackett - Genesis Revisited II (2012)
 Vocals on "The Return of the Giant Hogweed"
 Spock's Beard - Brief Nocturnes and Dreamless Sleep (2013)
 Writer of "Afterthoughts" and "Waiting for Me"
 Guitar on "Waiting for Me"
 Spock's Beard - The First Twenty Years (2015)
 Writer of "Falling for Forever"
 Co-lead vocals on "Falling for Forever"
 Project Aegis - And The Rest Is Mystery (2020)
 Co-lead vocals

References
General
 
 
 Neal Morse at Facebook
 Radiant Records
 
 
 

 Other

Discographies of American artists
Rock music discographies